The Love Story of Aliette Brunton is a 1924 British silent romance film directed by Maurice Elvey and starring Isobel Elsom, Henry Victor and James Carew. The film was based on the 1922 novel of the same title by Gilbert Frankau. The film was a success on its release.

This was the last film Elvey made for Stoll Pictures, leaving them shortly afterwards for independent work and later for Gaumont British.

Cast
 Isobel Elsom as Aliette Brunton 
 Henry Victor as Ronald Cavendish 
 James Carew as Hector Brunton 
 Humberston Wright as Admiral Brunton 
 Lewis Gilbert as William 
 Minna Leslie as Maggie Peterson 
 Adeline Hayden Coffin as Julia Cavendish

References

Bibliography
 Low, Rachel. The History of British Film: Volume IV, 1918–1929. Routledge, 1997.

External links

1924 films
British romance films
British silent feature films
1920s romance films
1920s English-language films
Films directed by Maurice Elvey
Films shot at Cricklewood Studios
Stoll Pictures films
British black-and-white films
Films based on British novels
1920s British films